Sceptrophasma is a genus of stick insects belonging to the tribe Gratidiini.  The species of this genus are found in Central Asia and Southern Asia.

Species
GBIF lists:
Sceptrophasma bituberculatum 
Sceptrophasma hispidulum 
Sceptrophasma humilis 
Sceptrophasma langkawicense

References

 
 

Gratidiini
Phasmatodea genera